Italia was the name of two Italian battleships, and may refer to:

, an ironclad battleship completed in 1885 and stricken in 1921
, a fast battleship completed in 1940 as Littorio, renamed Italia in 1943, and stricken in 1948

Italian Navy ship names